Bahçedere can refer to the following villages in Turkey:

 Bahçedere, Adilcevaz
 Bahçedere, Ayvacık
 Bahçedere, Dicle
 Bahçedere, Gerede
 Bahçedere, Maden